Shannon Dingle is an American Christian writer and activist. Her writings on life, race, and disability first garnered widespread attention leading up to the 2016 US presidential election. She is a contributor to USA Today, Teen Vogue and the Washington Post.

Life and education
Dingle grew up in Brandon, Florida. She was sexually abused as a child, becoming pregnant at 12 years old. She attended the University of North Carolina at Chapel Hill, earning the Edward Kidder Graham Award in 2003 for her leadership as a senior in Lutheran Campus Ministry and interfaith activities.

Career
Dingle joined Teach For America after college. She was profiled in the organisation's book Teaching as Leadership for success in teaching special education writing at Ringgold Middle School in Rio Grande City, Texas and earning the National Education Association's Foundation for the Improvement of Education. After her time at Ringgold, she taught high school in Raleigh, NC and then worked for Teach For America designing professional development training materials for special education corps members for Teach For America.

In June 2016, Christianity Today featured an interview with her, calling her "one of the voices at the forefront of the evangelical adoption movement." The article focused on her work with churches to include children with disabilities and children who are in adoptive or foster placements in the life of the church. At the time, she was working for the Christian non-profit organization Key Ministry as the Director of Education and Training, teaching churches how to welcome people with disabilities in their church and meaningfully include them in faith communities. As an expert in the field of disability ministry, she is profiled in the books Champion by Craig Johnson and Joel Osteen and Real Families, Real Needs by Joni Eareckson Tada

She wrote a viral article on opposing abortion rights and voting for Hillary Clinton in August 2016, which was reported in Slate, Daily Kos, HuffPost, and Sojourners. Her story as a Christian conservative woman rejecting Donald Trump as a candidate prior to the election, primarily due to his remarks on sexual assault, was profiled in The Wall Street Journal. She lost her job at Key Ministry due these events, being forced to resign because of her progressive politics and theology. Her activism lead to harassment from people self-identifying as part of the alt-right movement, which she discussed on the podcast Break It Down with guitarist Matt Carter from the band Emery.

As part of her advocacy work, she joined 31 other Christian women writers, speakers, and activists on the Ruby Woo Pilgrimage. These evangelical Christian woman — all wearing Ruby Woo, a shade of bright red lipstick from MAC Cosmetics — took a four-day journey to landmarks in women's and African-American history, culminating in visits with key lawmakers in DC on the final day.

Family
Dingle has six children, by birth and adoption, with her husband Lee, who died in a freak wave accident in 2019. Their family's perspectives on faith and finances were included in part of a series on NPR's All Things Considered, interviewed by Robert Siegel. Pictures and the story of their first adoption from Taiwan were included in a piece from the Huffington Post, which also mentioned their second adoption of three siblings from Uganda, one of them living with HIV. Their family's experiences with HIV discrimination was central to an article by The Today Show. More recently, Good Morning America featured their family in a back-to-school special featuring products for families.

References 

1982 births
Living people
American Christian writers
People from Brandon, Florida
University of North Carolina at Chapel Hill alumni
Writers from Florida
21st-century American non-fiction writers
21st-century American women writers
American women non-fiction writers